Vassilios Nikakis (born 28 September 1953) is a Greek former football referee. He officiated at the 1991 FIFA Women's World Cup, and was on call as a reserve official for the 1994 FIFA World Cup.

Nikakis later served as a FIFA referee inspector. In 2012, he stood as an election candidate for the Communist Party of Greece.

He is a candidate for the European Parliament with KKE, in the elections of 25 May 2014.

References

External links
profile at WorldReferee.com

1953 births
Greek football referees
Living people
FIFA Women's World Cup referees
Sportspeople from Agrinio